Tyreek Duren (born October 15, 1991) is an American professional basketball player for ZTE of the Hungarian League. The point guard attended Saints John Neumann and Maria Goretti Catholic High School in Philadelphia, Pennsylvania. He has earned Atlantic 10 Conference Second-Team recognition for two consecutive years.

References 

1991 births
Living people
AEK Larnaca B.C. players
American expatriate basketball people in Cyprus
American expatriate basketball people in France
American expatriate basketball people in Greece
American expatriate basketball people in Poland
American men's basketball players
Basketball players from Philadelphia
Kolossos Rodou B.C. players
La Salle Explorers men's basketball players
Point guards
SOMB Boulogne-sur-Mer players
Trefl Sopot players